The canton of Saint-Aignan is an administrative division of the Loir-et-Cher department, central France. Its borders were modified at the French canton reorganisation which came into effect in March 2015. Its seat is in Saint-Aignan.

It consists of the following communes:
 
Angé
Châteauvieux
Châtillon-sur-Cher
Chémery
Couffy
Mareuil-sur-Cher
Méhers
Meusnes
Noyers-sur-Cher
Pouillé
Rougeou
Saint-Aignan
Saint-Romain-sur-Cher
Seigy
Soings-en-Sologne
Thésée

References

Cantons of Loir-et-Cher